U.S. Route 20 (US 20) runs its easternmost  in the U.S. state of Massachusetts. The highway crosses the state border from New Lebanon, New York, into Hancock, Massachusetts, and runs eastward to Boston, where it ends at State Route 2 in Kenmore Square. It spends the vast majority of its journey paralleling I-90 (the Massachusetts Turnpike), which has largely superseded US-20 for through travel. Still, US-20 directly serves many towns and local business areas which the Turnpike bypasses.

U.S. Route 20 is currently the longest numbered highway in the entire country, at an estimated length of 3,365 miles between Boston and Newport, Oregon.

Parts of US 20 between the Worcester and Boston areas are part of an alignment of the Boston Post Road, an early colonial highway designated in 1673 for carrying mail between New York City and Boston. US 20 is still locally known as the "Boston Post Road" in the towns of Northborough, Marlborough, Sudbury, Wayland, and Weston.

Route description

Berkshire, Hampshire, and Hampden Counties
U.S. Route 20 begins its eastward trek crossing the New York state border into Hancock, Massachusetts and passing through the southern edge of the Pittsfield State Forest before entering Pittsfield and serving as the northern terminus of Route 41. The highway enters downtown and meets U.S. Route 7, near the western terminus of Route 9. After its intersection with US-7, US-20 heads south, and the two routes form a concurrency into the town of Lenox. In Lenox, Route 7A splits off from the main road to serve the center of town, and US-20 splits from US-7 shortly thereafter to travel through the town of Lee to the southeast. The highway passes through Lee and has an interchange with I-90 (the Massachusetts Turnpike) at Exit 10 (formerly Exit 2), south of town, near the eastern terminus of Route 102. Becoming the Jacob’s Ladder Scenic Byway for the next 30 miles, US-20 returns to its eastward direction at this point and closely parallels the Mass Pike, having three non-interchange junctions with it before entering the town of Becket and meeting Route 8. Route 8 northbound forms a concurrency with US-20 to directly serve the town, while the Mass Pike passes south of Becket. Upon crossing through the town center, Route 8 splits from US-20, and it continues eastbound, passing into Hampden County and the town of Chester.

US-20 passes through the small town of Chester, and clips the southern portion of Huntington in Hampshire County before re-entering Hampden County and passing through the town of Russell. In Russell, US-20 serves as the eastern terminus of Route 23,  passes under the Mass Pike, and continues into Westfield to finish off the scenic byway. In Westfield, US-20 crosses the U.S. Route 202/Route 10 concurrency in the city’s center, and serves as the northern terminus of Route 187 just to the east. US-20 begins to enter urban landscape as it crosses into West Springfield, making its way through downtown, intersecting U.S. Route 5, and crossing the Connecticut River into the city of Springfield. Immediately upon entering the city, US-20 interchanges with Interstate 91 at Exit 6 (formerly 8), where it leaves the surface street (which is picked up by Route 20A), to join Interstate 291, which begins just to the south. (Note: Route 20A is NOT a former alignment of US-20. Before the construction of I-291, US-20 followed Main, State Streets, and Boston Road). It splits off from the interstate via Exit 5, where it meets the eastern end of Route 20A and resumes its surface alignment on Page Boulevard in Springfield, rejoining its original alignment in Springfield on Boston Road. US-20, as Boston Road, serves as the southern terminus of  Route 21 and proceeds east into the town of Wilbraham, where it continues to parallel the Mass Pike. In Palmer, US-20 serves as the southern terminus of Route 181 and then intersects Route 32, which provides close access to the Mass Pike at Exit 63 (formerly 8). US-20 and Route 32 share a short concurrency in Downtown Palmer, before US-20 splits and continues east. Before leaving Palmer, Route 67 meets its southern terminus at US-20. Brimfield is the last town US-20 passes through in Hampden County; it enters from the west, crosses Route 19 in the center of town, and proceeds out of town to the east.

Worcester and Middlesex Counties
US-20 crosses into Worcester County and the town of Sturbridge, immediately serving as the southern terminus of Route 148. The route continues east where it serves as the western terminus of Route 131 before having an interchange with Interstate 84 at Exit 6 (formerly 3). I-84 is another quick route north to the Mass Pike, as it ends there less than a mile away.  Route 49, a short connector to Route 9 in Spencer, has its southern terminus at US-20 east of the I-84 interchange. US-20 enters the town of Charlton, passing through the village of Charlton City where it serves as the northern terminus  of Route 169 and intersects with Route 31. Continuing east, US-20 enters the town of Auburn,  where it briefly has a concurrency with Route 12. Route 12 provides direct access to the Mass Pike at Exit 90 (formerly 10), while US-20 has an interchange with Interstate 395, which ends at Interstate 290 north of the Mass Pike interchange. US-20 continues to the northeast, entering Millbury after briefly crossing into southern Worcester, where it has an interchange with the Mass Pike at Exit 94 (formerly 10A), as well as with Route 146 which at this point has a concurrency with  Route 122A. The route re-enters Worcester, crossing over Route 122 in a non-highway interchange. Leaving Worcester, US-20 enters the city of Shrewsbury, having another non-highway interchange with Route 140 south of downtown. The highway continues to the northeast, once again having a non-highway interchanging with Route 9. Heading almost due north at this point, US-20 crosses into Northborough, and turns back eastward, serving as  the western terminus of Route 135 in the town center. Two local roads, Church Street and Hudson Street, provide access to nearby I-290, which runs to the north. US-20 proceeds out of Northborough to the northeast, crossing into Marlborough and Middlesex County.

US-20 enters Marlborough and interchanges with Interstate 495 (also referred to as the Outer Circumferential Highway and the Blue Star Memorial Highway) at Exit 63 (formerly 24), effectively crossing into Boston's western suburbs. The route directly serves the center of town, intersecting with Route 85 in the process. It is in eastern Marlborough where US-20 begins to be famously referred to as Boston Post Road, and the road continues eastward into the town of Sudbury. Leaving Sudbury, US-20 intersects the Route 27/Route 126 concurrency in Wayland, and continues into Weston. US-20 does not intersect any major roads or numbered highways in Weston, but does follow an approximately mile-long bypass of the Boston Post Road (appropriately named Boston Post Road Bypass) between Highland Street and Wellesley Street, where US-20 rejoins the road and continues east into Waltham.  The entire length of US-20 in Weston is designated as the Boston Post Road Historic District, since it retains much of its rural 18th-century character. Immediately upon crossing into Waltham, US-20 has an  interchange with the concurrent Interstate 95/Highway 128 at Exit 41 (formerly 26), marking the change from suburban landscape to the urban landscape of metro Boston. US-20 serves as the eastern terminus of Route 117 and passes  through the center of Waltham and it’s downtown, serving as Main Street east of 117. In Waltham, US-20 also serves as the western terminus of Route 60, an urban route serving Boston's northern suburbs. The route continues into the city of Watertown serving as its Main Street to Watertown Square, where it has a major junction with Route 16, which passes west and north of Boston, through Cambridge and Medford. US-20 becomes North Beacon Street at this point and continues southeast as it crosses into the city of Boston over the North Beacon Street Bridge.

Suffolk County

US-20 briefly continues as Leo F. Birmingham Parkway upon crossing into the Boston neighborhood of Brighton, immediately intersecting the western end of Soldiers Field Road Extension. The route then turns right and continues as North Beacon Street again, crossing under the Mass Pike with no interchange. US-20 continues towards downtown, passing through the Allston neighborhood of Boston. Upon crossing Cambridge Street, US-20 becomes known as Brighton Ave for a short distance. US-20 soon reaches Commonwealth Ave, serving as the eastern terminus for Route 30. At this point, the Brookline/Norfolk County border lies just feet south of the road, and US-20 passes through Boston University.  US-20 meets Route 2 at the southern end of the Boston University Bridge, crossing over the Mass Pike for the final time without an interchange.  Route 2, via Mountfort Street, Park Drive, and Beacon Street, turns from south to east to meet US-20 at Kenmore Square. Upon meeting Route 2 again, US-20 meets its eastern terminus, with Route 2 taking Commonwealth Ave its final stretch to the Boston Public Garden and Route 28, where Route 2 meets its own end.

U.S. Route 20's official eastern terminus is in Kenmore Square at the intersection of Commonwealth Avenue, Beacon Street, and Brookline Avenue.

Major intersections

Suffixed routes

Route 20A is a state highway located entirely within Springfield, Massachusetts, United States. The route, an alternate route of U.S. Route 20, parallels the section of US 20 concurrent with Interstate 291. The western terminus is at the junction of US 20 and Interstate 91 in downtown Springfield east of where US 20 crosses the Connecticut River on the North End Bridge. The eastern terminus is at the junction between US 20 and I-291 northeast of the heart of the city.

This alignment provides an alternate to Interstate 291, which overlaps US 20 for much of its length, but was originally an alternate to old US 20, which ran down State Street and Boston Road. This route was therefore never part of US 20, but has served as an alternate to two separate routes.

Major intersections

References

External links

20
 Massachusetts
Transportation in Berkshire County, Massachusetts
Transportation in Hampden County, Massachusetts
Transportation in Hampshire County, Massachusetts
Transportation in Worcester County, Massachusetts
Transportation in Middlesex County, Massachusetts
Transportation in Suffolk County, Massachusetts